The 2004 U.S. Figure Skating Championships took place on January 3–11, 2004 at the Philips Arena in Atlanta, Georgia. Medals were awarded in four colors: gold (first), silver (second), bronze (third), and pewter (fourth) in four disciplines – men's singles, ladies' singles, pair skating, and ice dancing – across three levels: senior, junior, and novice.

The event was among the criteria used to select the U.S. teams for the 2004 World Championships, 2004 Four Continents Championships, and the 2004 World Figure Skating Championships.

Senior results

Men

Ladies

Pairs

Ice dancing

Junior results

Men

Ladies

Pairs

Ice dancing

Novice results

Men

Ladies

Pairs

Ice dancing

International team selections

World Championships

Four Continents Championships

World Junior Championships

Triglav Trophy

Gardena Spring Trophy

External links
 U.S. Figure Skating Names International Teams at the Internet Archive Wayback Machine
 2004 United States Figure Skating Championships

U.S. Figure Skating Championships
United States Figure Skating Championships, 2004
Figure Skating
January 2004 sports events in the United States